Tarján is a village in Komárom-Esztergom County, Hungary.

Notable people
 Zsolt Hernádi, Hungarian businessman

External links
 
 Street map (Hungarian)

Populated places in Komárom-Esztergom County
Hungarian German communities